Matrix metalloproteinase-25 is an enzyme that in humans is encoded by the MMP25 gene.

Proteins of the matrix metalloproteinase (MMP) family are involved in the breakdown of extracellular matrix in normal physiological processes, such as embryonic development, reproduction, and tissue remodeling, as well as in disease processes, such as arthritis and metastasis. Most MMPs are secreted as inactive proproteins which are activated when cleaved by extracellular proteinases. However, the protein encoded by this gene is a member of the membrane-type MMP (MT-MMP) subfamily, attached to the plasma membrane via a glycosylphosphatidyl inositol anchor. In response to bacterial infection or inflammation, the encoded protein is thought to inactivate alpha-1 proteinase inhibitor, a major tissue protectant against proteolytic enzymes released by activated neutrophils, facilitating the transendothelial migration of neutrophils to inflammatory sites. The encoded protein may also play a role in tumor invasion and metastasis through activation of MMP2. The gene has previously been referred to as MMP20 but has been renamed MMP25.

References

Further reading

External links
 The MEROPS online database for peptidases and their inhibitors: M10.024

Matrix metalloproteinases